Petro Kharchenko (also known as Petr Kharchenko; born 2 March 1983) is a Ukrainian former pair skater. With Tatiana Volosozhar, he won four medals on the ISU Junior Grand Prix series and became the 2004 Ukrainian national senior champion. The pair placed seventh at the 2003 European Championships.

Programs 
(with Volosozhar)

Competitive highlights
(with Volosozhar)

References

External links 

 

Ukrainian male pair skaters
1983 births
Living people
Sportspeople from Dnipro